Choerolophodontidae is an extinct family of large herbivorous mammals that were closely related to elephants. Two genera are known, Afrochoerodon and Choerolophodon.

Taxonomy
Although usually classified as part of Gomphotheriidae, recent cladistic analysis recovers choerolophodont gomphotheres as basal to trilophodont gomphotheres and therefore a distinct family.

Distribution
Fossils of choerolophodontids have been found in Africa, China, Anatolia, and the Balkans.

References

 
Elephantida
Prehistoric mammal families
Miocene first appearances
Miocene extinctions
Fossils of Serbia